Jan Čejka (born 29 May 2001) is a Czech swimmer. He competed in the men's 100 metre backstroke at the 2020 Summer Olympics.

References

External links
 

2001 births
Living people
Czech male swimmers
Olympic swimmers of the Czech Republic
Swimmers at the 2020 Summer Olympics
Place of birth missing (living people)
21st-century Czech people